The Moree Champion, previously published as the North West Champion, is a bi-weekly English language newspaper published in the Shire of Moree, New South Wales, Australia. The newspaper was first published in 1912. It is published each Tuesday and Thursday and is distributed throughout the north west region of New South Wales.

History 
The paper was first published in 1912 as the North West Champion. In 1968, the newspaper was the first provincial press to convert from letterpress printing to high resolution web offset printing. The newspaper's proprietor, Harry Sullivan, commemorated the change with a new title. On 21 March 1968, the Moree Champion, Vol. 1, No. 1, new series, was published as a sixty four page issue containing some sections in colour.

Digitisation 
The paper has been digitised as part of the Australian Newspapers Digitisation Program hosted by the National Library of Australia in cooperation with the State Library of New South Wales.

See also 
 List of newspapers in Australia

References

External links 
 Moree Champion
 

Newspapers published in New South Wales
North West Slopes
Moree Plains Shire
Newspapers on Trove